Palam is a town and a headquarter of Palam taluka. It's located in Parbhani district which is part of State of Maharashtra in India.

Demography
The Palam town has population of 14,286 of which 7,335 are males while 6,951 are females as per Population Census 2011.

Average Sex Ratio of Palam is 948 which is higher than Maharashtra state average of 929.

Palam has lower literacy rate compared to Maharashtra. In 2011, literacy rate of Palam village was 76.30% compared to 82.34% of Maharashtra. In Palam Male literacy stands at 84.33% while female literacy rate was 67.96%.

Schedule Caste (SC) constitutes 13.36% while Schedule Tribe (ST) were 1.84% of total population in Palam village.

Transport
Palam is located  towards south from district headquarters Parbhani.

Loha , Purna , Gangakhed , Nanded  are the other nearby Cities to Palam which have connectivity via road.

Nearest railway stations to Palam are Gangakhed and Purna.

Government and Politics
Palam comes under Parbhani (Lok Sabha constituency) for Indian general elections and current member of Parliament representing this constituency is Sanjay Haribhau Jadhav of Shiv Sena.

Palam comes under Gangakhed (Vidhan Sabha constituency) for assembly elections of Maharashtra. Current representative from this constituency in Maharashtra state assembly is Mr. Ratnakar Gutte (Kaka) of Rashtriya Samaj Paksh.https://www.electionsinindia.com/maharashtra/gangakhed-assembly-vidhan-sabha-constituency-elections

References

Cities and towns in Parbhani district
Talukas in Maharashtra